Kateryna Bondarenko was the defending champion, but chose not to participate.

Lesia Tsurenko won the title, defeating Karolína Plíšková in the final, 7–5, 6–3.

Seeds

Draw

Finals

Top half

Bottom half

References
 Main draw
 Qualifying draw

Slovak Open - Singles
2011 Women's Singles